Karl Blackburn (born December 27, 1967) is a business owner and former political figure in Quebec. He represented Roberval in the Quebec National Assembly from 2003 to 2007 as a Liberal.

He was born in Chicoutimi, Quebec, the son of Gaston Blackburn and Nicole Desbiens, and was educated in London and at the Université du Québec à Chicoutimi. Blackburn is director general of the family business and owner of a hardware business. He has served as chairman of the Roberval Chamber of Commerce and vice-president of the Saint-Félicien Chamber of Commerce. He was defeated when he ran for reelection in 2007.

References 
 

1967 births
Living people
Politicians from Saguenay, Quebec
Quebec Liberal Party MNAs
21st-century Canadian politicians